Broadway Big Shot is a 1942 American drama film directed by William Beaudine.

Synopsis
A reporter (Ralph Byrd) confesses to a crime in order to get into prison for an interview. Then he can't get out.

Cast
 Ralph Byrd as Jimmy O'Brien
 Virginia Vale as Betty Collins
 William Halligan as  Warden Collins
 Dick Rich as Tom Barnes
 Herbert Rawlinson as District Attorney
 Cecil Weston as Mrs. Briggs
 Tom Herbert as Carnation Charlie
 Stubby Kruger as Dynamite (as Harold Kruger)
 Frank Hagney as Butch
 Jack Buckley as Windy
 Harry Depp as Ben Marlo

References

External links
 

1942 films
1942 drama films
American drama films
American black-and-white films
Films directed by William Beaudine
Producers Releasing Corporation films
1940s American films